Karl Pschigode (28 April 1907 in Düsseldorf – 22 July 1971 in Munich) was a German actor and theater manager.

Pschigode came to Nuremberg in 1942 as an actor. In 1947 he took over the direction of the Städtische Bühnen Nürnberg (today Staatstheater Nürnberg) as artistic director, and from 1953 as general director. He remained in office until 1970.

External links 
 Karl Pschigode on Ludwig Maximilian University of Munich
 

1907 births
1971 deaths
Actors from Düsseldorf
German male film actors
German theatre directors